Frogville may refer to:

Frogville, Oklahoma, US, a small community
The Frogville, a 2014 Taiwanese animated film
Frogville Records, a record label in Santa Fe, New Mexico, US